Quévin Moisés Cachicote da Rocha de Castro (born 16 August 2001), known as just Quevin Castro, is a Portuguese professional footballer who plays as a central midfielder for Gateshead on loan from West Bromwich Albion.

Early life and education
Born in Portugal, Castro played in the academy at Sporting CP before moving to England. He grew up in Thetford, Norfolk, and attended The Thetford Academy.

Career
Castro played non-league football for Mildenhall Town, Thetford Town, Norwich CBS, Leiston and Bury Town during his early career. Castro had trial spells at Ipswich Town in 2019 and later in 2020, and also spent time on trial at Sutton United, Arsenal, Chelsea and West Bromwich Albion. 

In summer 2021, Castro signed for EFL Championship club West Bromwich Albion on a two-year contract following his trial at the club. He made his debut for the club on 25 August 2021, starting in a 6–0 EFL Cup second round defeat to Arsenal. Castro went onto make his league debut for West Brom on 28 February 2022, as a substitute in a 2–0 Championship defeat to Swansea City.

On 14 July 2022, Castro joined League One side Burton Albion on a season-long loan. Castro had his loan terminated by mutual consent on 1 September. On 12 September 2022, Castro joined National League club Notts County on loan until 8 January 2023. Upon the expiration of his contract, he joined fellow National League club Gateshead on loan until the end of the season.

Style of play
Castro has been described as an "energetic and powerful central midfielder".

Personal life
Castro was born in Portugal to a Santomean father and an Angolan mother. His brothers Rudy, Valter Rocha, and Aires are also footballers.

Career statistics

Honours 
West Bromwich Albion U23

 Premier League Cup winner: 2021–22

References

2001 births
Living people
Portuguese footballers
Portuguese sportspeople of Angolan descent
Portuguese people of São Tomé and Príncipe descent
Association football midfielders
Bury Town F.C. players
Mildenhall Town F.C. players
Thetford Town F.C. players
Norwich CBS F.C. players
Leiston F.C. players
West Bromwich Albion F.C. players
Burton Albion F.C. players
Notts County F.C. players
Gateshead F.C. players
English Football League players
Isthmian League players
Southern Football League players
National League (English football) players
Portuguese expatriate footballers
Expatriate footballers in England
Portuguese expatriate sportspeople in England